Ashley Hall Plantation is a historic plantation complex located on the Ashley River near West Ashley, Charleston County, South Carolina. The plantation was established in the early 1670s by Stephen Bull. The property includes a small tabby-walled house (c. 1675) with a 20th-century second story addition, the ruins of the Georgian plantation house (1704) which was burned in 1865 to prevent its destruction by Union forces, a monument to the second Governor William Bull (c. 1791), two prehistoric Indian archaeological sites, and two 18th century well sites associated with the plantation. The tabby house is considered one of the oldest standing houses in the state.

In 1915, the 1000 acre property was bought by Julius Jahnz for the price of $30,000, one of the highest prices paid for a real estate sale in many years. In the run up to World War I, some locals circulated a rumor that German-born Jahnz was shipping large amounts of concrete to his new property to erect a German fortress. In reality, the concrete was being used to construct a modern creamery on 400 acres of the property. Jahnz also undertook the clean-up of the grounds including the ruins of the Bull house and a monument erected to Bull's memory.

It was listed on the National Register of Historic Places in 1975.

References

Plantations in South Carolina
Plantation houses in South Carolina
Archaeological sites on the National Register of Historic Places in South Carolina
Houses on the National Register of Historic Places in South Carolina
Georgian architecture in South Carolina
Houses completed in 1675
Houses in Charleston County, South Carolina
National Register of Historic Places in Charleston County, South Carolina
Tabby buildings
Historic districts on the National Register of Historic Places in South Carolina
Burned houses in the United States
1675 establishments in South Carolina